The 2022–23 Slovak Cup is the 54th edition of the competition.

Spartak Trnava are the defending champions, defeating their rivals Slovan Bratislava in the 2022 final.

The winner of the Slovak Cup earns automatic qualification for the UEFA Europa Conference League second qualifying round.

Format
The Slovak Cup is played as a knockout tournament. All matches that end up as a draw after 90 minutes are decided by penalty shoot-outs. All rounds are played as one-off matches except the semi-finals, which are played over two legs.

Second round

|-
!colspan="3" align="center"|9 August 2022

|-
!colspan="3" align="center"|10 August 2022

|-
!colspan="3" align="center"|16 August 2022

|-
!colspan="3" align="center"|23 August 2022

|-
!colspan="3" align="center"|24 August 2022

|-
!colspan="3" align="center"|31 August 2022

|-
!colspan="3" align="center"|6 September 2022

|-
!colspan="3" align="center"|7 September 2022

	
	
|-
!colspan="3" align="center"|24 September 2022

|}

Third round

|-
!colspan="3" align="center"|13 September 2022

|-
!colspan="3" align="center"|14 September 2022

 	

|-
!colspan="3" align="center"|20 September 2022

|-
!colspan="3" align="center"|21 September 2022

|-
!colspan="3" align="center"|28 September 2022

|}

Fourth round
The draw for the fourth round was held on 3 October 2022.

|-
!colspan="3" align="center"|11 October 2022

|-
!colspan="3" align="center"|18 October 2022

	
|-
!colspan="3" align="center"|19 October 2022

|-
!colspan="3" align="center"|25 October 2022

|-
!colspan="3" align="center"|26 October 2022

|-
!colspan="3" align="center"|9 November 2022

|}

Round of 16
The draw for the round of 16 was held on 27 October 2022.

|-
!colspan="3" align="center"|8 November 2022

|-
!colspan="3" align="center"|9 November 2022

|-
!colspan="3" align="center"|7 February 2023

|}

Quarter-finals
The draw for the quarter-finals was held on 22 November 2022.

|-
!colspan="3" align="center"|28 February 2023

|-
!colspan="3" align="center"|1 March 2023

|-
!colspan="3" align="center"|7 March 2023

|-
!colspan="3" align="center"|8 March 2023

|}

Semi-finals
The draw for the semi-finals was held on 2 March 2023.

Summary

|}

Matches

Final

The final will be played on 1 May 2023 at the Anton Malatinský Stadium in Trnava.

See also
2022–23 Slovak First Football League
2023–24 UEFA Europa Conference League

References

External links
futbalsfz.sk

Slovak Cup seasons
Cup
Slovak Cup